Aldo Francisco Polo Ramirez (born 31 August 1983) is a Mexican footballer who last played for Venados F.C. of Ascenso MX.

Career
He began his career 2002 playing in the third division with club Tecamachalgo. Soon after he transferred to second division club Estudiantes de Santender where he spend  a year before transferring to Correcaminos UAT who played in the Liga de Ascenso. Soon after he transferred to  Dorados de Sinaloa 2005 and in 2006 with Club Leon where he spent 5 years. In 2011, he finally was signed by a first division club Puebla F.C. in the Liga de Ascenso Draft.

Footnotes

External links

1983 births
Living people
Correcaminos UAT footballers
Dorados de Sinaloa footballers
Club León footballers
Club Puebla players
Club Tijuana footballers
Liga MX players
Footballers from Mexico City
Mexican footballers
Association football defenders